Mahallah Bagh may refer to:
 Mahallah Bagh-e Hajj Sadeq
 Mahallah Bagh-e Jadid